Sidney Robert Nagel is an American physicist and the Stein-Freiler Distinguished Service Professor at the University of Chicago, where he is affiliated with the Department of Physics, the James Franck Institute, and the Enrico Fermi Institute. His research focuses on complex everyday physics such as "the anomalous flow of granular material, the long messy tendrils left by honey spooned from one dish to another, the pesky rings deposited by spilled coffee on a table after the liquid evaporates or the common splash of a drop of liquid onto a countertop." His work includes high-speed photography of splashing liquids and drop formation.

Nagel was born September 28, 1948 in New York, the son of Ernest Nagel and brother of mathematician Alexander Nagel.  His academic career began as a research associate at Brown University in 1974, and from there he went in 1976 to the University of Chicago, becoming a full professor in 1984, and gaining his present position in 2001.

Education 
Nagel graduated with a B.A. from Columbia University in 1969. He then received a Ph.D. in physics from Princeton University in 1975 after completing a doctoral dissertation, titled "Infrared properties of metals and wavevector dependent local field effects", under the supervision of Stephen E. Schnatterly.

Honors
Alfred P. Sloan Foundation Fellow, 1979–81
Fellow, American Physical Society, 1988
Fellow, American Association for the Advancement of Science, 1993
Quantrell Award for Excellence in Undergraduate Teaching, 1996
American Academy of Arts and Sciences, 1997
Louis Block Professor, 1998
Klopsteg Memorial Award, American Association of Physics Teachers, 1998
Oliver E. Buckley Condensed Matter Prize, American Physical Society, 1999
Stein-Freiler Distinguished Service Professor, 2001
Member, National Academy of Sciences, 2003
Member, American Philosophical Society, 2020
APS Medal, American Physical Society, 2023

Publications
Some 26 papers are available via Cornell University Library.

See also
Granular convection
Jamming (physics)
National Academy of Sciences

References

21st-century American physicists
1948 births
Living people
Columbia College (New York) alumni
University of Chicago faculty
Members of the American Philosophical Society
Members of the United States National Academy of Sciences
Oliver E. Buckley Condensed Matter Prize winners
Brown University alumni
Fellows of the American Physical Society